Sunil Kumar Kohli (S. K. Kohli) (born August 17, 1958), a senior Bureaucrat of Indian Civil Services, was the Financial Advisor to Defence Services (FADS). S.K Kohli was the 46th Controller General of Defence Accounts CGDA, Ministry of Defence, of the Republic of India.
He is from 1981 batch IDAS (Indian Defence Accounts Department )cadre. He was Addl CGDA, and Principal controller at Delhi  and before that he served as Joint Secretary in Ministry of Water Resources and is a  graduate from D.A.V College Amristar, Guru Nanak University and holds an LL.B. Degree from  University of Punjab. He holds a Degree from National Defence College, New Delhi on Defence Strategic Studies. He, as FADS, was mandated to advise the Ministry of Defence regarding both Capital and Revenue expenditures and Defence Budget of Govt. of India.He is a maverick Defence finance analyst. He superannuated on 31 August 2018, succeeded by Smt.Madhulika P. Sukul, IDAS(1982).

References

See also
 Indian Defence Accounts Service

1958 births
Living people
People from Punjab, India
Indian civil servants
National Defence College, India alumni